Crawshay's zebra (Equus quagga crawshayi) is a subspecies of the plains zebra native to eastern Zambia, east of the Luangwa River, Malawi, southeastern Tanzania, and northern Mozambique south to the Gorongoza District.  Crawshay's zebras can be distinguished from other subspecies of plains zebras in that its lower incisors lack an infundibulum.  Crawshay's zebra has very narrow stripes compared to other forms of the plains zebra.

References

Images

Zebras
Mammals of Zambia
Mammals of Malawi